The R289 road is a regional road in Ireland linking the R287 and the R280 in County Leitrim.

See also
Roads in Ireland

References

Regional roads in the Republic of Ireland
Roads in County Leitrim